Muhamed Tijani (born 26 July 2000) is a Nigerian footballer who plays as a forward for FC Baník Ostrava.

Club career

Baník Ostrava
Tijani joined Czech club Baník Ostrava's youth system from Nigerian side 36 Lion FC on 27 September 2018. He signed a professional contract with Baník Ostrava on 27 August 2019.

Loan to Třinec
Tijani joined Třinec on loan in the summer of 2019. He made his professional debut for the club on 27 August in a cup match against TJ Valasske Mezirici.

Loan to Karviná
In February 2020, Tijani was recalled early from his loan to Třinec and moved on loan to Karviná. He made his debut for Karviná on 3 June against Slovácko.

Return to Baník Ostrava
He returned from loan and made his debut for Baník Ostrava against his former club Karviná on 21 August 2020. Tijani scored his first goal for the club in a 3–0 league victory over FK Pardubice on 19 September.

Loan to Třinec
Tijani returned to Třinec on loan on 8 February 2021. He made his second debut against Blansko on 6 March.

Loan to Táborsko
Tijani was sent on loan to Táborsko for one year on 23 July 2021. He made his debut against Zbrojovka Brno that same day.  He scored his first two goals on 11 August in the Tatran Sedlcany Cup.

Return to Baník Ostrava
After returning to Baník Ostrava, he made his 2022–23 Czech First League debut against SK Sigma Olomouc on 30 July 2022. He scored his first goal of the season on 6 August against Bohemians 1905.

International career
Tijani was part of the Nigeria under-20 squad that competed in the 2019 FIFA U-20 World Cup. He played his first international match on 24 May 2019 against the Qatar under-20 side. He scored his first international goal on 30 May by way of a penalty kick against the Ukraine under-20s.

Career statistics

Club

Notes

References

External links
 
 
 Muhamed Tijani at Footballdatabase.eu
 Muhamed Tijani at Fortuna Liga
 Muhamed Tijani at Baník Ostrava

2000 births
Living people
Nigerian footballers
Nigeria youth international footballers
Nigerian expatriate footballers
Association football forwards
FC Baník Ostrava players
FK Fotbal Třinec players
MFK Karviná players
Czech National Football League players
Czech First League players
Nigerian expatriate sportspeople in the Czech Republic
Expatriate footballers in the Czech Republic
Nigeria under-20 international footballers